The Cierva C.17 was a British experimental autogyro built by Cierva Autogiro Company in England in 1928, in association with Avro (which designated it their Type 612). It was an attempt to build upon the successful Cierva C.8 design using the smaller, more streamlined fuselage of an Avro Avian IIIA as a starting point. The type was found to be underpowered, and when the first attempt at fitting a more powerful engine still did not result in acceptable performance, the design was abandoned.

Variants
C.17 Powered by a 67 kW (90 hp) A.D.C. Cirrus III piston engine.
C.17 Mk II Powered by an Avro Alpha radial piston engine.

Specifications

See also

References

1920s British experimental aircraft
Single-engined tractor autogyros
Aircraft first flown in 1928
C.17